The Shadows Nepal is a hard rock band from Narayangarh, Chitwan, Nepal. They were established in 1997 and their first album was titled “Suna Hamro  Sano Awaaz”.

Their second album, “Hidne Manche Ladcha”, was a success in the Nepali market and earned them the best band, best music and best performance of the year 2006. The band is mostly popular for its influential lyrics that discusses social issues and awareness. They traveled to three cities of Australia as a part of their international tour in 2011.

The band's current line up : Swapnil Sharma in Vocals, Prakash Rasaily on Guitars, Sujan Manandhar ( Guitars ), Sahil Risal ( drums ) and Amit Pradhan on Bass. Rupesh Sen worked with the band for pretty long time as a band manager.

See also
Nepalese rock

References

External links 
The Shadows 'Nepal'

Nepalese rock music groups
Nepalese musical groups
1997 establishments in Nepal
Musical groups from Chitwan